Drač County (/Drački okrug) was one of the counties of the Kingdom of Serbia established on 29 November 1912 on the part of the territory of Albania taken from the Ottoman Empire during the First Balkan War. Drač County had four districts (/Srez): Drač (Durrës), Lješ (Lezhë), Elbasan and Tirana. The army of the Kingdom of Serbia retreated from Durrës in April 1913.

Establishment 

The Royal Serbian Army captured city of Durazzo on 29 November 1912 without facing opposition. Orthodox Christian metropolitan of Durrës Jakob  gave a particularly warm welcome to the new authorities. He also secured friendly relations with the Serbian authorities in the region. As such he successfully intervened to them and several Albanian guerrilla units were saved and avoided execution.

The Kingdom of Serbia established district offices and appointed the governor of the county, mayor of the city, and commander of the military garrison. The first military governor of the city of Durrës, captain Branislav Milosavljević (commander of vanguard of Šumadijan unit), appointed the first city council which included Petar Djurasković (chairman), Hristo Spiro, Mehmed Efendi and others.

The first governor of Drač County was Ivan Ivanić, a Serbian diplomat. His wife Delfa, one of the founders of the Circle of Serbian Sisters, chaired the city hospital. The first mayor of Durrës was Petar Đurašković, a member of a family from this city, while members of the city council were Hristos Spiro, Imam Husein Efendi and Filip Serić. When the army of Kingdom of Serbia occupied Albania in 1912, Dragutin Anastasijević was engaged as a translator for the Greek language and, after a while, he was appointed as governor of Drač County instead of Ivan Ivanić.

Serbia's most important goal of the Balkan Wars was access to the open sea.

Disestablishment 

The army of the Kingdom of Serbia retreated from Durrës in April 1913 under pressure of the naval fleet of Great Powers, but it remained in other parts of Albania for the next two months.

References 

Military occupation
Kingdom of Serbia
Balkan Wars
1912 in Albania
1913 in Albania
States and territories established in 1912
States and territories disestablished in 1913
Former subdivisions of Serbia
1912 establishments in Serbia